Trevor Gleeson (born 28 May 1968) is an Australian professional basketball coach who is an assistant coach for the Toronto Raptors of the National Basketball Association (NBA). After starting his coaching career in his hometown of Warrnambool, Gleeson had his first stint in the National Basketball League (NBL) between 1997 and 2000 as an assistant coach with the Brisbane Bullets. Between 2000 and 2004, Gleeson coached in the Continental Basketball Association in the United States. After two years in South Korea, he returned to Australia in 2006 to coach the Townsville Crocodiles. Five seasons in North Queensland brought significant success, guiding the team to five consecutive post-season appearances and winning the NBL Coach of the Year Award in 2011. He then spent a season with the Melbourne Tigers and then worked with AFL clubs North Melbourne and Hawthorn before the opportunity to join the Perth Wildcats arose in 2013. Additionally, between 2014 and 2016, he served as an assistant coach for the Australian Boomers.

Between 2013 and 2021, Gleeson became the Wildcats' most successful coach, making the finals in every season and claiming five championships in 2014, 2016, 2017, 2019 and 2020. He is the only Wildcats coach to win multiple championships at the club and currently sits fifth all-time in NBL history for games coached. In 2021, Gleeson was named NBL Coach of the Year for the second time in his career.

Early life and career
Gleeson grew up in Warrnambool, Victoria, as a member of a sports-mad family with four older siblings. Gleeson played football and basketball as a youth, with the latter leading to a third-place finish at the Australian championships with Warrnambool's under 14 team. In 1985, he graduated from Warrnambool's Emmanuel College. His life change as an 18-year-old after a hydraulic door crushed his back in an industrial accident. He subsequently spent six weeks in hospital with the thought of his sporting career over. That accident was the coaching catalyst for Gleeson.

In 1990, Gleeson was appointed head coach of the Warrnambool Mermaids and guided the team to the championship in the Country Victorian Invitational Basketball League (CVIBL). In 1992, he made the switch to Warrnambool's men's side, the Seahawks, where he was head coach for two years. In 1993, he earned the role of head coach of the Victorian Basketball All Star Team. In the mid-1990s, Gleeson moved to the Gold Coast to continue his studies and coach the Griffith University men's basketball program.

Professional coaching career

Early years (1997–2006)
While based in Queensland, Gleeson received his first opportunity in the National Basketball League (NBL), joining the coaching staff of the Brisbane Bullets as a development coach. After three years with the Bullets between 1997 and 2000, the entire coaching staff was sacked and, on a whim, Gleeson flew to Los Angeles, not knowing anyone. Working as many summer basketball camps as he could, Gleeson connected with coaches such as former NBA player Bob Thornton. It was Thornton who invited Gleeson to join him at the CBA's Quad City Thunder. After one season as an assistant coach with Quad City, Gleeson spent the 2001–02 season as an assistant coach with the Sioux Falls Skyforce. He parted ways with Sioux Falls following the season, but in January 2003, he returned to the Skyforce and took over as head coach for the remainder of the 2002–03 season. He continued on as head coach of the Skyforce for the 2003–04 season.

For the 2004–05 season, Gleeson moved to South Korea to serve as an assistant coach with the Seoul Samsung Thunders of the Korean Basketball League. The 2005–06 season was then spent as an assistant with the Jeonju KCC Egis.

Townsville Crocodiles (2006–2011)
In 2006, Gleeson returned to Australia and was appointed head coach of the Townsville Crocodiles. The Crocodiles finished fifth on the regular season standings in each of his first three seasons, leading to quarter-final losses in 2007 and 2008, and then a semi-final appearance in 2009. The following two seasons saw the Crocodiles rise to a third-place finish in 2009–10 and then a second-place finish in 2010–11; however, both seasons ended in semi-final defeats. Gleeson's efforts in the 2010–11 season saw him earn the NBL Coach of the Year Award.

Melbourne Tigers (2011–2012)
For the 2011–12 season, Gleeson moved south and returned to his home state, joining the Melbourne Tigers as head coach. The three-year deal worth about $150,000 a season was a dream move for Gleeson, but the circumstances of his exit from the Crocodiles were related to a personal matter. Gleeson's wife Dawn was battling breast cancer at the time and Gleeson decided to return to home to Victoria for family support, with the Crocodiles giving their blessing to go for the Tigers job.

Gleeson assembled a capable squad at the Tigers in 2011, acquiring Patty Mills due to the NBA lockout and signing former Cairns Taipans trio Daniel Dillon, Ron Dorsey and Ayinde Ubaka. While the Tigers started the season with a 5–1 record, they went on to miss the post-season with an 11–17 record. The season was derailed by Mills' defection to China early in the campaign and the sacking of Ubaka by owner Seamus McPeake in January while Gleeson was conducting a post-match press conference.

In June 2012, Gleeson was sacked by the Tigers after weeks of speculation and a club review. New club owner and chief executive Larry Kestelman and new director of basketball Chris Anstey triggered an "investigation" into Gleeson's tenure, with the review revealing nothing other than Gleeson's "style" did not suit them.

Stint in the AFL
After parting ways with the Tigers, Gleeson remained in Melbourne and began working with Australian Football League (AFL) clubs North Melbourne and Hawthorn as a skills coach. His time at Hawthorn was the beginning of the club's golden era of success between 2012 and 2015, with Gleeson learning many coaching philosophies from future three-time premiership coach Alastair Clarkson. He learnt the importance of core sporting-team principles such as empowering players to lead a team's culture and standards.

Perth Wildcats (2013–2021)

First championship (2013–14)
In June 2013, Gleeson made his comeback to basketball after signing a three-year deal to be the head coach of the Perth Wildcats – the NBL's most successful franchise with five championships. In the months prior to joining the Wildcats, Gleeson was close to turning his back on basketball for good. Feeling refreshed after his AFL stint, but unsure of his coaching future long term, the chance to join the Wildcats in 2013 came at just the right time.

For his first season at the Wildcats, Gleeson recruited two athletic American imports in Jermaine Beal and James Ennis. After winning the NBL's preseason tournament, the Wildcats started the 2013–14 regular season with an 8–0 record. Gleeson went on to guide the Wildcats to the minor premiership with a 21–7 record, before guiding them through to the NBL Grand Final series, where they defeated the Adelaide 36ers in three games to win the championship.

Second championship (2015–16)
After an injury-riddled season in 2014–15 saw the Wildcats earn a semi-final defeat, Gleeson was confident heading into the 2015–16 season that he had assembled the right blend of players, after conceding his side struggled with chemistry issues in 2014–15. A banged-up Perth was swept out of the playoffs in 2015 following a fourth-place finish which marked an underwhelming follow-up to its title-winning campaign in 2014. Gleeson made a conscious effort to ensure chemistry was right during the 2015 off-season. Following a large player turnover, the Wildcats were confident high-profile recruits Casey Prather and Nate Jawai – as well as back-up guard Jarrod Kenny – would be strong fits among the group dynamic.

The Wildcats were relatively injury-free in 2015–16 and finished the regular season in second place with an 18–10 record. Gleeson went on to guide the Wildcats back to the NBL Grand Final series, where they defeated the New Zealand Breakers in three games to win his second championship in three years. He subsequently became the first two-time championship-winning Wildcats coach.

Third championship (2016–17)

The 2016 off-season saw Gleeson re-sign with the Wildcats on a three-year deal, while the team parted ways with Jawai, Tom Jervis and Beal. To replace them, Gleeson brought in Angus Brandt, Jameel McKay and Jaron Johnson, and headed into the 2016–17 season attempting to secure the club's first back-to-back championships since 1991.

The Wildcats started the season with a 4–1 record before slumping to the bottom of the ladder in December with seven wins and nine losses. The injury toll was a key factor, as was the chemistry balance. The club's recruiting was put under the spotlight when they axed import Jaron Johnson in December for a second time—Johnson was first axed just three games into the season in order to bring in three-point specialist Andre Ingram, who lasted only a week. Johnson was reinstated, but was then shown the door again in December as the Wildcats turned their attention to a new point guard. The Wildcats were under siege at the Christmas break, but saw a resurgence starting with a must-win game against the Illawarra Hawks on New Year's Eve. Amid the turmoil, the club assured Gleeson his job was safe, with some calling for Gleeson to be sacked himself. Then, against the odds, the Wildcats beat the Hawks, signed Bryce Cotton and their season changed.

Behind import duo Cotton and Prather, and with Gleeson's vision realised, the Wildcats won eight of their remaining twelve regular season games, including two must-win encounters in the final round to squeeze into the post-season. From there, the Wildcats rolled through the finals undefeated, sweeping the Cairns Taipans in the semi-finals and then sweeping the Illawarra Hawks in the grand final series. The Wildcats went back-to-back for the first time since 1990/1991, while Gleeson became the first coach to guide the Wildcats to back-to-back championships—Cal Bruton was coach in 1990, while Murray Arnold was coach in 1991.

2017–18 season
The Wildcats started the 2017–18 season with a 10–3 record before dropping to 13–8 on 19 January 2018 with a loss to the Sydney Kings at home. The game marked Gleeson's 150th game as coach of the Wildcats. The loss to the Kings continued Perth's inconsistency, having not won consecutive games since mid-December and having lost three straight at home—that had not happened since 2008. On 2 February, the Wildcats improved to 15–9 with a 111–90 win over the Adelaide 36ers. The win was Gleeson's 200th of his career. The Wildcats finished the regular season in third place with a 16–12 record before losing to Adelaide in straight sets in the semi-finals.

Fourth championship (2018–19)

A 130–72 loss to the NBA's Utah Jazz in the pre-season was labeled an embarrassment, with Gleeson taking the loss to heart and ensured it was used as a learning experience. It enabled Gleeson to lay the foundations to what eventually became a title-winning season.

The Wildcats started the 2018–19 season with a 10–1 record before dropping to 12–9 by mid-January. The Wildcats went on to win six straight games to lock up the minor premiership before losing the regular-season finale in overtime to Melbourne United, thus finishing with an 18–10 record. Gleeson coached the team to the top of the table despite enormous adversity. Captain Damian Martin (calf), starting centre Angus Brandt (ankle) and back-up guard Mitch Norton (calf) missed large chunks of the season, while imports Bryce Cotton (thumb/hamstring) and Terrico White (hamstring/wrist) also missed games. The Wildcats were under intense external pressure to make changes to their roster, including signing a third import, after going through a slump where they lost eight out of 10 games, but Gleeson refused to budge and the players responded. He guided the Wildcats to a 2–0 win over the Brisbane Bullets in the semi-finals before a 3–1 victory over Melbourne United in the grand final series saw the Wildcats win their ninth championship, with Gleeson winning his fourth title and making history by becoming the first coach in NBL history to win four championships with one team.

Fifth championship (2019–20)
On 22 March 2019, Gleeson re-signed with the Wildcats for three more seasons. In July 2019, he joined the Indiana Pacers coaching staff for the NBA Summer League.

The Wildcats dropped to an 8–5 record at the conclusion of round 9 of the 2019–20 season following a poor display against the Adelaide 36ers at home. The loss followed a dramatic drop off in the final quarter against Cairns the previous week when Perth gave up a 12-point lead to lose by seven points. The Taipans also belted them by 23 points in Perth earlier in the season, while Sydney beat the Wildcats by 19 points in November also. Gleeson subsequently admitted he was at a loss to explain why there was such a massive gap between his team's best and worst performances. Gleeson and the Wildcats responded with two big wins in round 10, first thrashing the top-of-the-table Sydney Kings at home and then defeating the South East Melbourne Phoenix in Melbourne. In December 2019, Gleeson coached his 400th NBL game, becoming just the eighth coach in NBL history to reach the milestone. After losing back-to-back games to start January 2020, Gleeson and the Wildcats decided to release import Dario Hunt and replace him with seven-year NBA veteran Miles Plumlee. The team went on to win six of the final seven games of the season to finish in second place with a 19–9 record. It marked the Wildcats' best regular season record since the 21–7 campaign in 2013–14.

After defeating the Taipans 2–1 in the semi-finals, the Wildcats faced the Kings in the NBL Grand Final. In the grand final series, the Wildcats took Game 1 in Sydney before the Kings levelled the series with a win in Perth. The Wildcats went on to take a 2–1 series lead with a win in Game 3 in Sydney. Due to the coronavirus outbreak, it was decided that Games 2–5 would take place behind closed doors. Following Game 3 however, the Kings refused to take part in the final two games of the series, withdrawing citing health and safety concerns. As a result of a series cancellation and with Perth up 2–1, the NBL declared the Wildcats the champions for the 2019–20 season, with Gleeson thus claiming his fifth NBL championship.

Coach of the Year and sixth grand final (2020–21)
In February 2021, Gleeson coached the Wildcats for the 231st time, surpassing Alan Black to set a new club record. He also became the winningest coach in Wildcats history with his 146th win. With his 250th career win later that month, he became just the sixth coach in NBL history to reach that milestone, and the third fastest to do it at 424 games. He coached his 250th Wildcats game in April, having won 64.7 per cent of those games. In May 2021, he coached his 450th NBL game and led the Wildcats to a finals berth for the 35th straight year. He was subsequently NBL Coach of the Year for the second time in his career and first as coach of the Wildcats. He guided the Wildcats to a sixth grand final in eight years with a 2–1 semi-final series victory over the Illawarra Hawks. They went on to lose 3–0 to Melbourne United in the grand final series.

On 12 July 2021, Gleeson requested to be released from the final year of his contract with the Wildcats after receiving an NBA coaching opportunity.

Toronto Raptors (2021–present)
On 2 August 2021, Gleeson was appointed an assistant coach of the Toronto Raptors for the 2021–22 NBA season. His first game as an NBA assistant coach came on 20 October 2021 in the Raptors' 98–83 season-opening loss to the Washington Wizards in Toronto. He started the season as the Raptors' offensive coach but was rotated mid-season to defence by head coach Nick Nurse. He helped the Raptors reach the 2022 NBA playoffs.

National team duties

In June 2014, Gleeson was called up to the Australian Boomers coaching staff for the 2014 FIBA Basketball World Cup. He served as an assistant alongside head coach Andrej Lemanis. He continued on as Lemanis' assistant in 2015 and 2016, as he was a part of the Boomers' 2015 FIBA Oceania Championship triumph as well as their Rio Olympics campaign.

Personal
Gleeson and his wife Dawn have two children, son Taj and daughter Shae. Gleeson met his wife while in the United States coaching the Sioux Falls Skyforce. While living in Townsville, Gleeson urged Dawn to see a doctor after she discovered an unusual lump. A diagnosis of breast cancer followed. Dawn was cancer free for six years until in 2017 she was informed that her breast cancer had recurred. The experience not only inspired Gleeson to become an advocate for women's health, but also a Western Australian Ambassador for the Mother's Day Classic—an annual fun run and walk raising funds and awareness for breast cancer research. In 2017, Gleeson and the Wildcats launched what became an annual "Pink Game", where the team wears pink uniforms in one regular-season game to raise awareness and funds for Breast Cancer Care WA.

In May 2016, Gleeson's brother died in tragic circumstances during a family holiday.

References

External links

NBL profile (2006)
Emmanuel College alumni bio
300 NBL games
350 NBL games
400 NBL games
Gleeson's PlayersVoice piece
"One-on-one with Perth Wildcats championship coach Trevor Gleeson" at thewest.com.au
"Perth Wildcats coach Trevor Gleeson's journey of drive and determination" thewest.com.au
"Perth Wildcats Pink Game: How Dawn and Trevor Gleeson got through their greatest battle" thewest.com.au
"From Warrnambool to the NBL: How home shaped Perth Wildcats coach Trevor Gleeson" at standard.net.au

1968 births
Living people
Australian expatriate basketball people in the United States
Australian men's basketball coaches
Brisbane Bullets coaches
Continental Basketball Association coaches
National Basketball League (Australia) coaches
Perth Wildcats coaches
Seoul Samsung Thunders coaches
Sioux Falls Skyforce coaches
Townsville Crocodiles coaches